is Japanese politician who was the governor of Ibaraki Prefecture from 1993 to 2017.

Life 
Masaru Hashimoto was born on 19 November 1945 in Tōkai, Ibaraki Prefecture.

He is a graduate of the University of Tokyo, and joined the Ministry of Home Affairs in 1969.

References

External links 

  

1945 births
Living people
University of Tokyo alumni
Governors of Ibaraki Prefecture